Bayer AG (commonly pronounced) is a German multinational pharmaceutical and biotechnology company and one of the largest pharmaceutical companies in the world. Headquartered in Leverkusen, Bayer's areas of business include pharmaceuticals; consumer healthcare products, agricultural chemicals, seeds and biotechnology products. The company is a component of the EURO STOXX 50 stock market index.

Bayer was founded in 1863 in Barmen as a partnership between dye salesman Friedrich Bayer (1825–1880) and dyer Friedrich Weskott (1821–1876). As was common in this era, the company was established as a dyestuffs producer. The versatility of aniline chemistry led Bayer to expand their business into other areas, and in 1899 Bayer launched the compound acetylsalicylic acid under the trademarked name Aspirin. In 1904 Bayer received a trademark for the "Bayer Cross" logo, which was subsequently stamped onto each aspirin tablet, creating an iconic product that is still sold by Bayer. Other commonly known products initially commercialized by Bayer include heroin, phenobarbital, polyurethanes, and polycarbonates.

In 1925 Bayer merged with five other German companies to form IG Farben, creating the world's largest chemical and pharmaceutical company. Following World War II, the Allied Control Council seized IG Farben's assets because of its role in the Nazi war effort and involvement in the Holocaust including using slave labour from concentration camps and humans for dangerous medical testing, and production of Zyklon B, a chemical used in gas chambers. In 1951 IG Farben was split into its constituent companies, and Bayer was reincorporated as Farbenfabriken Bayer AG.

Early history

Foundation

Bayer AG was founded as a dyestuffs factory in 1863 in Barmen (later part of Wuppertal), Germany, by Friedrich Bayer and his partner, Johann Friedrich Weskott, a master dyer. Bayer was responsible for the commercial tasks. Fuchsine and aniline became the company's most important products.

The headquarters and most production facilities moved from Barmen to a larger area in Elberfeld in 1866. Friedrich Bayer (1851–1920), son of the company's founder, was a chemist and joined the company in 1873. After the death of his father in 1880, the company became a joint-stock company, Farbenfabriken vorm. Friedr. Bayern & Co, also known as Elberfelder Farbenfabriken.

A further expansion in Elberfeld was impossible, so the company moved to the village Wiesdorf at Rhein and settled in the area of the alizarin producer Leverkus and Sons. A new city, Leverkusen, was founded there in 1930 and became home to Bayer AG's headquarters. The company's corporate logo, the Bayer cross, was introduced in 1904, consisting of the word BAYER written vertically and horizontally, sharing the Y and enclosed in a circle. An illuminated version of the logo is a landmark in Leverkusen.

Aspirin

Bayer's first major product was acetylsalicylic acid—first described by French chemist Charles Frederic Gerhardt in 1853—a modification of salicylic acid or salicin, a folk remedy found in the bark of the willow plant. By 1899, Bayer's trademark Aspirin was registered worldwide for Bayer's brand of acetylsalicylic acid, but it lost its trademark status in the United States, France and the United Kingdom after the confiscation of Bayer's US assets and trademarks during World War I by the United States, and because of the subsequent widespread usage of the word.

The term aspirin continued to be used in the US, UK and France for all brands of the drug, but it is still a registered trademark of Bayer in over 80 countries, including Canada, Mexico, Germany and Switzerland. As of 2011, approximately 40,000 tons of aspirin were produced each year and 10–20 billion tablets consumed in the United States alone for prevention of cardiovascular events. It is on the WHO Model List of Essential Medicines, the most important medications needed in a basic health system.

There is an unresolved controversy over the roles played by Bayer scientists in the development of aspirin. Arthur Eichengrün, a Bayer chemist, said he was the first to discover an aspirin formulation that did not have the unpleasant side effects of nausea and gastric pain. He also said he had invented the name aspirin and was the first person to use the new formulation to test its safety and efficacy. Bayer contends that aspirin was discovered by Felix Hoffmann to help his father, who had arthritis. Various sources support the conflicting claims. Most mainstream historians attribute the invention of aspirin to Hoffmann and/or Eichengrün.

Heroin

Heroin (diacetylmorphine), now illegal as an addictive drug, was introduced as a non-addictive substitute for morphine, and trademarked and marketed by Bayer from 1898 to 1910 as a cough suppressant and over-the-counter treatment for other common ailments, including pneumonia and tuberculosis. Bayer scientists were not the first to make heroin, but the company led the way in commercializing it. Heroin was a Bayer trademark until after World War I. Bayer's director of pharmacology did not want the drug to have "too complicated a name" so Bayer settled on heroisch, the German word for heroic.

Phenobarbital
In 1903, Bayer licensed the patent for the hypnotic drug diethylbarbituric acid from its inventors Emil Fischer and Joseph von Mering. It was marketed under the trade name Veronal as a sleep aid beginning in 1904. Systematic investigations of the effect of structural changes on potency and duration of action at Bayer led to the discovery of phenobarbital in 1911 and the discovery of its potent anti-epileptic activity in 1912. Phenobarbital was among the most widely used drugs for the treatment of epilepsy through the 1970s, and as of 2014 it remains on the World Health Organization's list of essential medications.

World War I

During World War I (1914–1918), Bayer's assets, including the rights to its name and trademarks, were confiscated in the United States, Canada and several other countries. In the United States and Canada, Bayer's assets and trademarks, including the well-known Bayer cross, were acquired by Sterling Drug, a predecessor of Sterling Winthrop and were not reclaimed until 1994.

Throughout the war, Bayer was involved in production and development of various chemical weapons. In 1914, Bayer manufactured dianisidine chlorosulfate for use in 105 mm artillery shell, intended as a lung irritant against British forces.

In 1916, Bayer scientists discovered suramin, an anti-parasite drug that is still sold by Bayer under the brand name Germanin. The formula of suramin was kept secret by Bayer for commercial reasons, but it was elucidated and published in 1924 by Ernest Fourneau and his team at the Pasteur Institute. It is on the World Health Organization's List of Essential Medicines.

IG Farben
In 1925, Bayer became part of IG Farben, a German conglomerate formed from the merger of six chemical companies: BASF, Bayer, Hoechst (including Cassella and Chemische Fabrik Kalle), Agfa, Chemische Fabrik Griesheim-Elektron, and Chemische Fabrik vorm. Weiler Ter Meer. In the 1930s, Gerhard Domagk, director of Bayer's Institute of Pathology and Bacteriology, working with chemists Fritz Mietzsch and Joseph Klarer, discovered prontosil, the first commercially available antibacterial drug. The discovery and development of this first sulfonamide drug opened a new era in medicine. Domagk won the Nobel Prize in Physiology or Medicine in 1939 "for the discovery of the antibacterial effects of prontosil". He was forced by the Nazi Party to relinquish the reward; German citizens had been forbidden from accepting Nobel prizes since the Nobel committee had awarded the 1935 Nobel Peace Prize to a German pacifist, Carl von Ossietzky.

World War II and the Holocaust

Helge Wehmeier, then CEO of Bayer, offered a public apology in 1995 to Elie Wiesel for the company's actions during World War II (1939–1945) and the Holocaust. IG Farben, Bayer's parent company, used slave labour in factories it built in Nazi concentration camps, most notably in the Monowitz concentration camp (known as Auschwitz III), part of the Auschwitz camp complex in German-occupied Poland. By 1943, almost half of IG Farben's 330,000-strong workforce consisted of slave labour or conscripts, including 30,000 Auschwitz prisoners.

Helmuth Vetter, an Auschwitz camp physician, SS captain and employee of the Bayer group within IG Farben conducted medical experiments on inmates at Auschwitz and at the Mauthausen concentration camp. In one study of an anaesthetic, the company paid RM 170 per person for the use of 150 female inmates of Auschwitz. A Bayer employee wrote to Rudolf Höss, the Auschwitz commandant: "The transport of 150 women arrived in good condition. However, we were unable to obtain conclusive results because they died during the experiments. We would kindly request that you send us another group of women to the same number and at the same price."

After the war, the Allied Control Council seized IG Farben for "knowingly and prominently ... building up and maintaining German war potential". It was split into its six constituent companies in 1951, then split again into three: BASF, Bayer and Hoechst. Bayer was at that point known as Farbenfabriken Bayer AG; it changed its name to Bayer AG in 1972. After the war, some employees of Bayer appeared in the IG Farben Trial, one of the Nuremberg Subsequent Tribunals under US jurisdiction. Among them was Fritz ter Meer, who helped to plan the Monowitz camp (Auschwitz III) and IG Farben's Buna Werke factory at Auschwitz, where medical experimentation had been conducted and where 25,000 forced laborers were deployed. Ter Meer was sentenced to seven years, but was released in 1950 for good behavior.  He was elected to Bayer AG's supervisory board in 1956, a position he retained until 1964.

Products

Overview
In 1953, Bayer brought the first neuroleptic (chlorpromazine) onto the German market. In the 1960s, Bayer
introduced a pregnancy test, Primodos, that consisted of two pills that contained norethisterone (as acetate) and ethinylestradiol. It detected pregnancy by inducing menstruation in women who were not pregnant; the presence or absence of menstrual bleeding was then used to determine whether the user was pregnant. The test became the subject of controversy when it was blamed for birth defects, and it was withdrawn from the market in the mid-1970s. Litigation in the 1980s ended inconclusively. A review of the matter by the Medicines and Healthcare products Regulatory Agency in 2014 assessed the studies performed to date and found the evidence for adverse effects to be inconclusive.

In 1978, Bayer purchased Miles Laboratories and its subsidiaries Miles Canada and Cutter Laboratories, acquiring along with them a variety of product lines including Alka-Seltzer, Flintstones vitamins and One-A-Day vitamins, and Cutter insect repellent.

Along with the purchase of Cutter, Bayer acquired Cutter's Factor VIII business. Factor VIII, a clotting agent used to treat hemophilia, was produced, at the time, by processing donated blood. In the early days of the AIDS epidemic, people with hemophilia were found to have higher rates of AIDS, and by 1983 the CDC had identified contaminated blood products as a source of infection. According to the New York Times, this was "one of the worst drug-related medical disasters in history". Companies, including Bayer, developed new ways to treat donated blood with heat to decontaminate it, and these new products were introduced early in 1984. In 1997, Bayer and the other three makers of such blood products agreed to pay $660 million to settle cases on behalf of more than 6,000 hemophiliacs infected in United States. But in 2003, documents emerged showing that Cutter had continued to sell unheated blood products in markets outside the US until 1985, including in Malaysia, Singapore, Indonesia, Japan and Argentina, to offload a product they were unable to sell in Europe and the US; they also continued manufacturing the unheated product for several months. Bayer said it did this because some countries were doubtful about the efficacy of the new product.

Bayer has been involved in other controversies regarding its drug products. In the late 1990s it introduced a statin drug, Baycol (cerivastatin), but after 52 deaths were attributed to it, Bayer discontinued it in 2001. The side effect was rhabdomyolysis, causing kidney failure, which occurred with a tenfold greater frequency in patients treated with Baycol in comparison to those prescribed alternate medications of the statin class. Trasylol (aprotinin), used to control bleeding during major surgery, was withdrawn from the market worldwide in 2007 when reports of increased mortality emerged; it was later re-introduced in Europe but not in the US.

Top-selling pharmaceutical products
In 2014, pharmaceutical products contributed €12.05 billion of Bayer's €40.15 billion in gross revenue. In 2019, identified "key growth" products were Xarelto (rivaroxaban), Eylea (aflibercept), Stivarga (regorafenib), Xofigo (radium-223), and Adempas (riociguat). Top-selling products as of 2014 included:

 Kogenate (recombinant clotting factor VIII). Kogenate is a recombinant version of clotting factor VIII, the absence or deficiency of which causes the abnormal bleeding associated with haemophilia type A. Kogenate is one of several commercially available Factor VIII products having equivalent efficacy.
 Xarelto (rivaroxaban) is a small molecule inhibitor of Factor Xa, a key enzyme involved in blood coagulation. In the United States, the FDA has approved rivaroxaban for the prevention of stroke in people with atrial fibrillation, for the treatment of deep vein thrombosis and pulmonary embolism, and for the prevention of deep vein thrombosis in people undergoing hip surgery. Rivaroxaban competes with other newer generation anticoagulants such as edoxaban, apixaban, and dabigatran as well as with the generic anticoagulant warfarin. It has similar efficacy to warfarin and is associated with a lower risk of intracranial bleeding, but unlike warfarin there is no established protocol for rapidly reversing its effects in the event of uncontrolled bleeding or the need for emergency surgery.
 Betaseron (interferon beta-1b) is an injectable form of the protein interferon beta used to prevent relapses in the relapsing remitting form of multiple sclerosis. Betaseron competes with other injectable forms of interferon beta, glatiramer acetate, and a variety of newer multiple sclerosis drugs, some of which can be taken orally (Dimethyl fumarate, teriflunomide, others).
 Yasmin / Yaz birth control pills are part of a group of birth control pill products based on the progestin drospirenone. Yaz is approved in the United States for the prevention of pregnancy, to treat symptoms of premenstrual dysphoric disorder in women who choose an oral contraceptive for contraception, and to treat moderate acne in women at least 14 years of age who choose an oral contraceptive for contraception. The FDA conducted a safety review regarding the potential of Yaz and other drospirenone-containing products to increase the risk of blood clots; Yaz and Yasmin were associated with the deaths of 23 women in Canada, leading Health Canada to issue a warning in 2011. Although conflicting results were obtained in different studies, the FDA added a warning to the label in 2012 that Yaz and related products may be associated with an increased risk of clotting relative to other birth control pill products. Subsequently, a meta analysis suggested that birth control pills of the class Yasmin belongs to raise the risk of blood clots to a greater extent than some other classes of birth control pills.
Nexavar (sorafenib) is a kinase inhibitor used in the treatment of liver cancer (hepatocellular carcinoma), kidney cancer (renal cell carcinoma), and certain types of thyroid cancer.
 Trasylol (Aprotinin) Trasylol is a trypsin inhibitor used to control bleeding during major surgery. In a 2006 meeting called by the FDA to review the drug's safety, Bayer scientists failed to reveal the results of an ongoing large study suggesting that Trasylol may increase the risks of death and stroke. According to a FDA official who preferred to remain anonymous, the FDA learned of the study only through information provided to the FDA by a whistleblowing scientist who was involved in it. The study concluded Trasylol carried greater risks of death, serious kidney damage, congestive heart failure and strokes. On 15 December of the same year, the FDA restricted the use of Trasylol, and in November 2007, they requested that the company suspend marketing. In 2011, Health Canada lifted its suspension of Trasylol for its originally approved indication of limiting bleeding in coronary bypass surgery, citing flaws in the design of the studies that led to its suspension. This decision was controversial. In 2013, the European Medicines Agency lifted its suspension of the Trasylol marketing authorization for selected patients undergoing cardiac bypass surgery, citing a favorable risk-benefit ratio.
 Cipro (ciprofloxacin) Ciprofloxacin was approved by the US Food and Drug Administration (FDA) in 1987. Ciprofloxacin is the most widely used of the second-generation quinolone antibiotics that came into clinical use in the late 1980s and early 1990s. In 2010, over 20 million outpatient prescriptions were written for ciprofloxacin, making it the 35th-most commonly prescribed drug, and the 5th-most commonly prescribed antibacterial, in the US.
Rennie antacid tablets, one of the biggest selling branded over-the-counter medications sold in Great Britain, with sales of £29.8 million.

Agricultural
Bayer produces various fungicides, herbicides, insecticides, and some crop varieties.

Fungicides are primarily marketed for cereal crops, fresh produce, fungal with bacteria-based pesticides, and control of mildew and rust diseases. Nativo products are a mixture of trifloxystrobin tebuconazole. XPro products are a mix of bixafen and prothioconazole, while Luna contains fluopyram and pyrimethanil.
Herbicides are marketed primarily for field crops and orchards. Liberty brands containing glufosinate (a.k.a. Liberty or Basta) are used for general weed control. Capreno containing a mixture of thiencarbazone-methyl and tembotrione is used for grass and broad-leaf control.
Insecticides are marketed according to specific crop and insect pest type. Foliar insecticides include Belt containing flubendiamide, which is marketed against Lepidopteran pests, and Movento containing spirotetramat, which is marketed against sucking insects. Neonicotinoids such as clothianidin and imidacloprid are used as systemic seed treatments products such as Poncho and Gaucho. In 2008, neonicotinoids came under increasing scrutiny over their environmental impacts starting in Germany. Neonicotinoid use has been linked in a range of studies to adverse ecological effects, including honey-bee colony collapse disorder (CCD) and loss of birds due to a reduction in insect populations. In 2013, the European Union and a few non EU countries restricted the use of certain neonicotinoids. Parathion was discovered by scientists at IG Farben in the 1940s as a cholinesterase inhibitor insecticide. Propoxur is a carbamate insecticide that was introduced by Bayer in 1959.

Acquisitions

Overview
In 1994, Bayer AG purchased Sterling Winthrop's over-the-counter (OTC) drug business from SmithKline Beecham and merged it with Miles Laboratories, thereby reclaiming the U.S. and Canadian trademark rights to "Bayer" and the Bayer cross, as well as the ownership of the Aspirin trademark in Canada.

In 2004, Bayer HealthCare acquired the over-the-counter pharmaceutical division of Roche. In March 2008, Bayer HealthCare announced an agreement to acquire the portfolio and OTC division of privately owned Sagmel, Inc., a US-based company that markets OTC medications in most of the Commonwealth of Independent States countries such as Russia, Ukraine, Kazakhstan, Belarus, and others.

On 28 August 2008, an explosion occurred at the Bayer CropScience facility at Institute, West Virginia, United States. A runaway reaction ruptured a tank and the resulting explosion killed two employees. The ruptured tank was close to a methyl isocyanate tank which was undamaged by the explosion.

Acquisition of Schering
In March 2006, Merck KGaA announced a €14.6bn bid for Schering AG, founded in 1851. By 2006, Schering had annual gross revenue of around €5 billion and employed about 26,000 people in 140 subsidiaries worldwide. Bayer responded with a white knight bid and in July acquired the majority of shares of Schering for €14.6bn, and in 2007, Bayer took over Schering AG and formed Bayer Schering Pharma. The acquisition of Schering was the largest take-over in Bayer's history, and as of 2015, was one of the ten biggest pharma mergers of all time.

Other acquisitions
In November 2010, Bayer AG signed an agreement to buy Auckland-based animal health company Bomac Group. Bayer partnered on the development of the radiotherapeutic Xofigo with Algeta, and in 2014, moved to acquire the company for about $2.9 billion. In 2014, Bayer agreed to buy Merck's consumer health business for $14.2 billion which would provide Bayer control with brands such as Claritin, Coppertone and Dr. Scholl's. Bayer would attain second place globally in nonprescription drugs. In June 2015, Bayer agreed to sell its diabetic care business to Panasonic Healthcare Holdings for a fee of $1.02 billion.

In August 2019, the business acquired the ≈60% of BlueRock Therapeutics it didn't already own for up to $600 million.

In August 2020, Bayer announced it had acquired KaNDy Therapeutics Ltd, helping to boost its female healthcare business, for $425 million. In October, Bayer agreed to acquire Asklepios BioPharmaceuticals for $2 billion upfront.

In June 2021, the company announced it acquire Noria Therapeutics Inc. and PSMA Therapeutics Inc. gaining rights to a number of cancer-based investigational compounds based on actinium-225.

Spin off of Covestro
In September 2015, Bayer spun out its $12.3 billion materials science division into a separate, publicly traded company called Covestro in which it retained about a 70% interest. Bayer spun out the division because it had relatively low profit margins compared to its life science divisions (10.2%, compared with 24.9% for the agriculture business and 27.5% for healthcare) and because the business required high levels of investment to maintain its growth, and to more clearly focus its efforts and identity in the life sciences. Covestro shares were first offered on the Frankfurt Stock Exchange in October 2015. Effective January 2016 following the spinout of Covestro, Bayer rebranded itself as a life sciences company, and restructured into three divisions and one business unit: Pharmaceuticals, Consumer Health, Crop Science, and Animal Health.

Acquisition of Monsanto
In May 2016, Bayer offered to buy U.S. seeds company Monsanto for $62 billion. Shortly after Bayer's offer, Monsanto rejected the acquisition bid, seeking a higher price. In September 2016, Monsanto agreed to a $66 billion offer by Bayer. In order to receive regulatory approval, Bayer agreed to divest a significant amount of its current agricultural assets to BASF in a series of deals. On 21 March 2018 the deal was approved by the European Union, and it was approved in the United States on 20 May 2018. The sale closed on 7 June 2018. The Monsanto brand was discontinued; its products will be marketed under the Bayer name. On 16 September 2019, under the approval of National Company Law Tribunal, Bayer completed the merger of Monsanto India.

Bayer's Monsanto acquisition is the biggest acquisition by a German company to date. However, owing to ongoing litigation concerning the herbicide Roundup, produced by Monsanto, the deal is considered one of the worst corporate deals ever agreed, owing to the massive financial and reputational blows it has caused Bayer.

Acquisition history

Bayer
Miles Laboratories (Acq 1978)
Miles Canada
Cutter Laboratories
Hollister-Stier
Corn King Company
Plastron Specialties
Pacific Plastics Company
Olympic Plastics Company
Ashe-Lockhart Inc
Haver-Glover Laboratories
Sterling Winthrop (Acq 1994, Over the counter division)
Roche Pharmaceuticals (Acq 2004, Over the counter division)
Schering AG (Acq 2006, formed Bayer Schering Pharma AG, renamed Bayer HealthCare Pharmaceuticals in 2011)
Jenapharm
Bomac Group (Acq 2010)
Algeta (Acq 2014)
Merck & Co (Acq 2014, Consumer Health Business)
Monsanto (Spun off from Pharmacia & Upjohn 2000)
Emergent Genetics (Acq 2005)
Seminis (Acq 2005)
Icoria, Inc (Acq 2005)
Delta & Pine Land Company (Acq 2007)
De Ruiter Seeds (Acq 2008)
Agroeste Sementes (Acq 2008)
Aly Participacoes Ltda (Acq 2008)
CanaVialis S.A. 
Alellyx S.A.
Divergence, Inc (Acq 2011)
Beeologics (Acq 2011)
Precision Planting Inc (Acq 2012)
Climate Corp (Acq 2013)
640 Labs (Acq 2014)
Agradis, Inc (Acq 2013)
Rosetta Green Ltd (Acq 2013)
American Seeds, Inc
Channel Bio Corp (Acq 2004)
Stone Seeds (Acq 2005)
Trelay Seeds (Acq 2005)
Stewart Seeds (Acq 2005)
Fontanelle Hybrids (Acq 2005)
Specialty Hybrids (Acq 2005) 	
NC+ Hybrids, Inc (Acq 2005)
Diener Seeds (Seed marketing and sales division, acq 2006)
Sieben Hybrids (Acq 2006)
Kruger Seed Company (Acq 2006)
Trisler Seed Farms (Acq 2006)
Campbell Seed ((Seed marketing and sales business, acq 2006))
Gold Country Seed, Inc (Acq 2006)
Heritage Seeds (Acq 2013)
International Seed Group, Inc
Poloni Semences (Acq 2007)
Charentais Melon Breeding Company (Acq 2007)
BlueRock Therapeutics (Acq 2019)
KaNDy Therapeutics Ltd (Acq 2020)
Asklepios BioPharmaceutical (Acq 2020)
Noria Therapeutics Inc. (Acq 2021)
PSMA Therapeutics Inc. (Acq 2021)
Vividion Therapeutics (Acq 2021)

Corporate structure

In 2003, to separate operational and strategic managements, Bayer AG was reorganized into a holding company. The group's core businesses were transformed into limited companies, each controlled by Bayer AG. These companies were: Bayer CropScience AG; Bayer HealthCare AG; Bayer MaterialScience AG and Bayer Chemicals AG, and the three service limited companies Bayer Technology Services GmbH, Bayer Business Services GmbH and Bayer Industry Services GmbH & Co. OHG. In 2016, the company began a second restructuring with the aim of allowing it to transition to a life sciences based company. By divesting its Chemicals division in 2004 and with the aim of off-loading its Materials division by mid-2016, Bayer will be left with the four core units, as depicted below.

Bayer CropScience
Bayer CropScience has products in crop protection (i.e. pesticides), nonagricultural pest control, and seeds and plant biotechnology. In addition to conventional agrochemical business, it is involved in genetic engineering of food. In 2002, Bayer AG acquired Aventis (now part of Sanofi) CropScience and fused it with their own agrochemicals division (Bayer Pflanzenschutz or "Crop Protection") to form Bayer CropScience; the Belgian biotech company Plant Genetic Systems became part of Bayer through the Aventis acquisition. Also in 2002, Bayer AG acquired the Dutch seed company Nunhems, which at the time was one of the world's top five seed companies. In 2006, the U.S. Department of Agriculture announced that Bayer CropScience's LibertyLink genetically modified rice had contaminated the U.S. rice supply. Shortly after the public learned of the contamination, the E.U. banned imports of U.S. long-grain rice and the futures price plunged. In April 2010, a Lonoke County, Arkansas jury awarded a dozen farmers $48 million. The case was appealed to the Arkansas Supreme Court, which affirmed the judgement. On 1 July 2011, Bayer CropScience agreed to a global settlement for up to $750 million. In September 2014, the firm announced plans to invest $1 billion in the United States between 2013 and 2016. A Bayer spokesperson said that the largest investments will be made to expand the production of its herbicide Liberty. Liberty is an alternative to Monsanto's product, Roundup, which are both used to kill weeds.
 In 2016, as part of the wholesale corporate restructuring, Bayer CropScience became one of the three major divisions of Bayer AG, reporting directly to the head of the division, Liam Condon. Under the terms of the merger, Bayer promised to maintain Monsanto's more than 9,000 U.S. jobs and add 3,000 new U.S. high-tech positions.
The prospective merger parties said at the time the combined agriculture business planned to spend $16 billion on research and development over the next six years and at least $8 billion on research and development in the United States.
The global headquarters of Bayer CropScience is located in St. Louis, Missouri, United States.

Bayer CropScience Limited is the Indian subsidiary of Bayer AG. It is listed on the Indian stock exchanges viz. the Bombay Stock Exchange & National Stock Exchange of India and has a market capitalization of $2 billion. Bayer BioScience, headquartered in Hyderabad, India, has about 400 employees, and has research, production, and an extensive sales network spread across India.

Bayer Consumer Health
Before the 2016 restructuring, Bayer HealthCare comprises a further four subdivisions: Bayer Schering Pharma, Bayer Consumer Care, Bayer Animal Health and Bayer Medical Care. As part of the corporate restructuring, Animal Health was moved into its own business unit, leaving the division with the following categories; Allergy, Analgesics, Cardiovascular Risk Prevention, Cough & Cold, Dermatology, Foot Care, Gastrointestinals, Nutritionals and Sun Care.

Bayer Consumer Care manages Bayer's OTC medicines portfolio. Key products include analgesics such as Bayer Aspirin and Aleve, food supplements Redoxon and Berocca, and skincare products Bepanthen and Bepanthol. Women's healthcare is an example of a General Medicine business unit. Bayer Pharma produces the birth control pills Yaz and Yasmin. Both pills use a newer type of progestin hormone called drospirenone in combination with estrogen. Yaz is advertised as a treatment for premenstrual dysphoric disorder (PMDD) and moderate acne. Other key products include the cancer drug Nexavar, the multiple sclerosis drug betaferon/betaseron and the blood-clotting drug, Kogenate. In May 2014, it was announced that Bayer would buy Merck & Co's consumer health care unit for $14.2 billion. Bayer also controls Dihon Pharmaceutical Group Co., Ltd in China.

Bayer Pharmaceuticals

The Pharmaceuticals Division focuses on prescription products, especially for women's healthcare and cardiology, and also on specialty therapeutics in the areas of oncology, hematology and ophthalmology. The division also comprises the Radiology Business Unit which markets contrast-enhanced diagnostic imaging equipment together with the necessary contrast agents.

In addition to internal R&D, Bayer has participated in public–private partnerships. One example in the area of non-clinical safety assessment is the InnoMed PredTox program. Another is the Innovative Medicines Initiative of EFPIA and the European Commission.

Defunct business units
Bayer Chemicals AG (with the exception of H.C. Starck and Wolff Walsrode) was combined with certain components of the polymers segment to form the new company Lanxess on 1 July 2004; Lanxess was listed on the Frankfurt Stock Exchange in early 2005. Bayer HealthCare's Diagnostics Division was acquired by Siemens Medical Solutions in January 2007.

Bayer sold its Animal Health business to Elanco in 2020.

Bayer Diabetes Care managed Bayer's medical devices portfolio. Key products included the blood glucose monitors Contour Next EZ (XT), Contour, Contour USB and Breeze 2 used in the management of diabetes. The diabetes business unit was sold to Panasonic Healthcare Co. for $1.15 billion in June 2015. Bayer MaterialScience was a supplier of high-tech polymers, and developed solutions for a broad range of applications relevant to everyday life. On 18 September 2014, the Board of Directors of Bayer AG announced plans to float the Bayer MaterialScience business on the stock market as a separate entity. On 1 June 2015, Bayer announced that the new company would be named Covestro; Bayer formally spun out Covestro in September 2015.

Finances 
For the fiscal year 2017, Bayer reported earnings of EUR€7.3 billion, with an annual revenue of EUR€35 billion, a decrease of 25.1% over the previous fiscal cycle. Bayer's shares traded at over €69 per share, and its market capitalization was valued at US€65.4 billion in November 2018. In September 2019, Bayer announced to reduce the number of management board members from seven to five to reduce overall costs.

Bayer 04 Leverkusen

In 1904, the company founded the sports club TuS 04 ("Turn- und Spielverein der Farbenfabriken vorm. Friedr. Bayer & Co."), later SV Bayer 04 ("Sportvereinigung Bayer 04 Leverkusen"), finally becoming TSV Bayer 04 Leverkusen ("Turn- und Sportverein") in 1984, generally, however, known simply as Bayer 04 Leverkusen. The club is best known for its football team, but has been involved in many other sports, including athletics, fencing, team handball, volleyball, boxing, and basketball. TSV Bayer 04 Leverkusen is one of the largest sports clubs in Germany. The company also supports similar clubs at other company sites, including Dormagen (particularly handball), Wuppertal (particularly volleyball), and Krefeld-Uerdingen (featuring another former Bundesliga football club, SC Bayer 05 Uerdingen, now KFC Uerdingen 05).

Awards and recognition
In October 2008, Bayer's Canadian division was named one of "Canada's Top 100 Employers" by Mediacorp Canada Inc. The Canadian division was named one of Greater Toronto's Top Employers by the Toronto Star newspaper. Bayer USA was given a score of 85 (out of 100) in the Human Rights Campaign's 2011 Corporate Equality Index, a measure of gay and lesbian workplace equality.

In 2016, Standard Ethics Aei gave a rating to Bayer in order to include the company in its Standard Ethics German Index. Bayer received an EE- rating, the fourth tier in an eight-tier ranking.

Ranked third in Access to Seeds Index in 2016.

Litigation

Roundup
In August 2018, two months after Bayer acquired Monsanto, a U.S. jury ordered Monsanto to pay $289 million to a school groundskeeper who claimed his Non-Hodgkin's lymphoma was caused by regularly using Roundup, a glyphosate-based herbicide produced by Monsanto. Following the verdict, Bayer's share price dropped by around 14% or $14 Billion in market capitalization. The company filed an appeal on 18 September 2018. Pending appeal, the award was later reduced to $78.5 million. In November 2018, Monsanto appealed the judgement, asking an appellate court to consider a motion for a new trial. A verdict on the appeal was delivered in June 2020 upholding the verdict but further reducing the award to $21.5 million. On 13 May 2019, a United States Superior Court Judge ordered Bayer to pay more than $ 2.5 billion in damages to a couple in California, both of whom contracted non-Hodgkin's Lymphoma, later cut to $87 million on appeal.)

In June 2020, the company agreed to pay $9.6 billion to settle more than 10,000 lawsuits claiming harm from Roundup, saying this action will result in the resolution of 75% of those claims. Bayer will also assign $1.25 billion for future claims, an action that needs approval from the US District Court, Northern District of California. The settlement, according to the company, does not admit either liability or wrongdoing, but brings an end to irresolution in the case. The settlement does not include three cases that have already gone to jury trials and are being appealed. In July 2020, the California Court of Appeals denied the appeal but reduced the damages owed to $20.4 million.

The general consensus among national regulatory agencies, and the European Commission is that labeled usage of the herbicide poses no carcinogenic or genotoxic risk to humans. In January 2020, the US Environmental Protection Agency (EPA) finalized its interim registration review for Roundup, stating that it "...did not identify any risks of concern" for cancer and other risks to humans from glyphosate exposure."

Xarelto

In 2019, Bayer and Johnson & Johnson (who market Xarelto together) settled around 25,000 lawsuits on the blood thinning drug Xarelto (rivaroxaban) by agreeing to disburse $775 million (US) to federal and state plaintiffs who said the companies had not properly warned patients about possible fatal bleeding as a result of ingesting the drug. There was no admission of liability from the companies in the settlement as they noted they had prevailed in six previous trials. The settlement will be divided evenly between the companies.

One A Day Vitamins

In 2019, a federal jury in San Francisco CA sided with Bayer in a $600 million (US) class action suit alleging that the company misinformed consumers by promoting its One A Day vitamins as supporting cardiac health, vigorous immune systems and boosting user energy. The suit was first filed as a nationwide class action; in 2017, the US District Court in San Francisco said subclasses of purchasers of the vitamin in Florida, New York, and California could act together.

The jury found that the plaintiffs failed to prove that Bayer misrepresented its One A Day claims, and also did not demonstrate that any of the class representative consumers who purchased One A Day relied on the so-called false information as part of their buying decision.

HIV contamination
In the mid-1980s, when Bayer's Cutter Laboratories realized that their blood products, the clotting agents Factor VIII and IX, were contaminated with HIV, the financial investment in the product was considered too high to destroy the inventory. Bayer misrepresented the results of its own research and knowingly supplied hemophilia medication tainted with HIV to patients in Asia and Latin America, without the precaution of heat treating the product, recommended for eliminating the risk. As a consequence, thousands who infused the product tested positive for HIV and later developed AIDS.

Dicamba
On 14 February 2020, Bayer and BASF were ordered to pay Missouri peach farmer Bill Bader $15 million in damages as a result of destruction of his peach trees which was caused by the usage of dicamba by nearby farmers. Dicamba was another product which Bayer acquired from Monsanto. Bayer also inherited the lawsuit from Monsanto as well. On 15 February 2020, Bayer-representing Monsanto- and BASF were ordered to pay not only the $15 million in damages, but an additional $250 million in punitive damages. Bayer and BASF afterwards announced plans to appeal the $265 million fine.

In June 2020, Bayer agreed to a settlement of up to $400 million for all 2015–2020 crop year dicamba claims, not including the $265 million judgement. On 25 November 2020, U.S. District Judge Stephen Limbaugh Jr. reduced the punitive damage amount in the Bader Farms case to $60 million.

PCB pollution

In June 2020, Bayer agreed to pay $800 million to settle lawsuits in a variety of jurisdictions which claimed contamination of public waterways with PCBs by Monsanto before 1978. On 25 November 2020, however, U.S. District Judge Fernando M. Olguin rejected Bayer's settlement offer, which was now at $650 million, and allowed Monsanto-related lawsuits involving PCB to proceed.

See also
 List of German companies
 List of pharmaceutical companies

References

Notes

Sources

Works cited

Further reading
 
 Blaschke, Stefan (1999). Unternehmen und Gemeinde: Das Bayerwerk im Raum Leverkusen 1891–1914. Cologne: SH-Verlag. 
 
 
 
 
 
 Tenfelde, Klaus (2007). Stimmt die Chemie? : Mitbestimmung und Sozialpolitik in der Geschichte des Bayer-Konzerns. Essen: Klartext.

External links

 
 

 
1950s initial public offerings
Agriculture companies of Germany
Aspirin
Biotechnology companies of Germany
Chemical companies of Germany
Companies based in North Rhine-Westphalia
Companies listed on the Frankfurt Stock Exchange
Companies formerly listed on the Tokyo Stock Exchange
Companies in the Euro Stoxx 50
Companies involved in the Holocaust
Genetic engineering and agriculture
German brands
German companies established in 1863
Health care companies of Germany
IG Farben
Life sciences industry
Leverkusen
Chemical companies established in 1863
Pharmaceutical companies established in 1863
Multinational companies headquartered in Germany
Nanotechnology companies
Orphan drug companies
Pharmaceutical companies of Germany